Linda S. Siegel (born 1942) is an American-born psychologist and academic known for her research into the cognitive aspects of learning disabilities. She is Professor Emeritus in the Department of Educational and Counselling Psychology, and Special Education at the University of British Columbia in Vancouver, Canada where she held the Dorothy C. Lam Chair in Special Education.

Life and career

Siegel was born in Washington, D.C., but grew up in New York City where her family moved when she was six years old. She received her B.A. in 1963 from Queens College, City University of New York and went on to post-graduate work at Yale University where she received her M.S.in 1964 and Ph.D. in 1966. Her doctoral dissertation was on information processing in children.

Before her appointment to the Dorothy C. Lam Chair in Special Education at the University of British Columbia in 1996, Siegel held posts at the University of Missouri in Columbia; Department of Psychiatry McMaster University Medical Centre, in Hamilton, Ontario; and Ontario Institute for Studies in Education in Toronto. In 2004 she was awarded an Honorary Doctorate from the University of Gothenburg in Sweden and held the university's Kerstin Hesselgren Visiting Professorship for the academic year 2004/2005.

Siegel was awarded the 2010 Canadian Psychological Association Gold Medal for Distinguished Lifetime Contributions to Canadian Psychology, and in 2012 she became the first recipient of the Australian Journal of Learning Difficulties Eminent Researcher Award. Her most recent book, Understanding dyslexia and other learning disabilities, was published by Pacific Educational Press in 2013.

Research
Siegel's earliest research was on human information processing which in the 1980s became increasingly focused on developmental disabilities, especially reading disability. Many of her most well-known papers are on the relationship between IQ and reading disability classification. Her research on that relationship has at times proved controversial. In her 2012 paper "Confessions and Reflections of the Black Sheep of the Learning Disabilities Field", Siegel presented evidence from her long-term research to support her contention "that the IQ score is unnecessary in the diagnosis of whether or not there is a learning disability". She also criticized as "very regressive", trends to demand testing for "'processing deficits', even though there is no evidence that processing deficits are useful for either diagnosis or remediation" of learning disabilities.

Siegel has been one of several academics who have criticized studies supportive of "brain training" programs and especially the Arrowsmith program founded by Barbara Arrowsmith Young in 1978.
Siegel appeared in Fixing My Brain, a 2008 CBC documentary, about the Arrowsmith program, although a portion of her highly critical commentary was removed prior to broadcast after Arrowsmith Young's lawyers threatened the CBC with a lawsuit.

Works with overviews of Siegel's research include Brueggemann Taylor's 2014 book Diagnostic Assessment of Learning Disabilities in Childhood and the 2003 article by Hayman-Abello et al., "Human neuropsychology in Canada: The 1990s".

References

External links
Linda Siegel profile at University of British Columbia

American women psychologists
American developmental psychologists
Educational psychologists
Psychology educators
Academic staff of the University of British Columbia
University of Missouri faculty
Yale University alumni
Queens College, City University of New York alumni
1942 births
Living people
American women academics
21st-century American women
American educational psychologists